Otto Fuchs (15 February 1893 – 12 October 1968) was an Austrian footballer. He played in three matches for the Austria national football team from 1920 to 1921.

References

External links
 

1893 births
1968 deaths
Austrian footballers
Austria international footballers
Place of birth missing
Association footballers not categorized by position